Omorgus verrucosus is a species of hide beetle in the subfamily Omorginae and subgenus Afromorgus.

References

verrucosus
Beetles described in 1856